Zarcasaurus tanyderus is a species of araeoscelid reptile found in the Cutler Formation (Early Permian) of New Mexico. The only elements of the skeleton known from this animal is a partial jaw bone, vertebrae, and broken limb bones.

References

Prehistoric diapsids
Permian reptiles of North America
Paleontology in New Mexico
Prehistoric reptile genera